The Dethalbum is the debut album by virtual band Dethklok, from American animated sitcom Metalocalypse. It was released on September 25, 2007. The album features full length songs from the TV series, as well as previously unreleased tracks. Antonio Canobbio contributed the artwork for the record.

The deluxe edition of the album includes an additional disc that features seven bonus tracks, the video for "Bloodrocuted" and the first Metalocalypse episode of the second season. A vinyl LP was released with a bonus track in July 2008.

A tour band, using session metal musicians and headed by Brendon Small, was created to promote the album. Small also provided music videos that are remade specifically for concert performances, which were later released on a DVD included with the special edition of Dethalbum II.

Release and reception

 
The Dethalbum was released on September 25, 2007. The album was released both as a single CD and a two-disc deluxe edition. The deluxe edition of the album includes an additional disc that features seven bonus tracks, the video for "Bloodrocuted" and the first Metalocalypse episode of the second season. In July 2008, Williams Street began selling a limited edition vinyl version of The Dethalbum on their online store. This version contains every song from the standard album, along with the "Gulf Danzig" remix of "Go into the Water."

The album debuted at number 21 on the Billboard 200 chart, with 33,740 copies sold in its first week. The Dethalbum was also streamed 45,000 times when it went live on AOL Music during the week of its release. The album was the highest charting death metal album in the history of the Billboard 200, before Dethalbum II overtook it.

A guitar transcription book of this album was released under Alfred Music Publishing, which included a DVD of Skwisgaar teaching the solo to "Duncan Hills Coffee Jingle" and Brendon Small teaching the "Deththeme". Nine tracks from this album are included in the Dethklok bass tab anthology.

Other appearances
"Hatredcopter" was released prior to the album's release on the European edition of the Saw III Soundtrack. An earlier, shorter version of the song "Thunderhorse" is featured on Guitar Hero II. The song "Murmaider" was used in the soundtrack for the video game Brütal Legend.

Track listing

The iTunes deluxe version includes all songs from The Dethalbum and the "Bloodrocuted" video, but only three of the seven bonus tracks: "Blood Ocean", "Murdertrain a Comin'", and "Hatredy".

Personnel

Virtual personnel from Metalocalypse

Dethklok
 Nathan Explosion – lead vocals, lyricist
 Skwisgaar Skwigelf – lead guitar, backing vocals
 Toki Wartooth – rhythm guitar, backing vocals
 Pickles – drums, vocals on "Hatredcopter" and "Kill You"
 William Murderface – bass

Production
 Dick "Magic Ears" Knubbler – production, engineering, mixing
 Charles Foster Offdensen – Legal council, management, CFO

Actual personnel
 Brendon Small – vocals, all other instruments, production
 Gene Hoglan – drums
 Emilie Autumn – violins on "Dethharmonic"
 Tommy Blacha – voice-over

Production
 Ulrich Wild – production, engineering (at Bombshelter Studios in Los Angeles), mixing (at Noize in the Attic)
 Raider – assistant mixing
 Ryan Page – line production
 Mike Gerlach – assistant engineering
 Tom Baker – mastering (at Precision Mastering in Los Angeles)
 Antonio Canobbio – album artwork

References

External links
 Dethklok on Myspace

2007 debut albums
Dethklok albums
Albums produced by Ulrich Wild
Williams Street Records albums